Wally Prigg (1908–1980) was an Australian rugby league footballer. He played nineteen Tests for the Kangaroos between 1929–38, seven as captain and was the first Australian player to make three tours to Great Britain with the Australian national rugby league team. He has been named amongst the nation's finest footballers of the 20th century.

Club and state playing career

Wally Prigg was one of the great forwards in the history of rugby league. He spent his whole career as a Newcastle Wests and Central Charlestown player. He was the first New South Wales country based player to captain the Australian national rugby league team.

He made his first appearance for New South Wales at the age of 20. Between 1929 and 1939 he made 32 appearances for New South Wales, a record at the time. He scored twelve tries, thirty-six points for New South Wales. His game was based around short passing and close support play.

Australian representative career
Prigg was selected to make the 1929–30 and the 1933–34 tours of Great Britain. He toured with the Australia on their tours of New Zealand in 1935 and 1937 and the on the Kangaroo Tour of England in 1937–1938 when he was tour captain. He played in all five Tests of that tour as captain and in 24 minor matches. He was the first man to be picked for three Kangaroo tours. His leadership style and skills were respected by English fans. His final Test match for Australia was the first ever between Australia and France in 1938. Prigg retired with the record for most Test caps for the Kangaroos, breaking the record set by original Kangaroo tourist Sid Pearce, Prigg played 19 Tests for Australia between 1929–38. He scored a total of four tries (twelve 12 points) for Australia.

Accolades
Post football Prigg operated a general store in the Newcastle suburb of Hamilton.  He died in 1980 at the age of 71. In 2003 he was admitted into the Australian Rugby League Hall of Fame. In February 2008, Prigg was named in the list of Australia's 100 Greatest Players (1908–2007) which was commissioned by the NRL and ARL to celebrate the code's centenary year in Australia.

In 2008 Prigg was named in New South Wales' rugby league team of the century.

References
 Whiticker, Alan (2004) Captaining the Kangaroos, New Holland, Sydney

External links
Australian Rugby League Hall of Fame

Footnotes

1908 births
1980 deaths
Australia national rugby league team captains
Australia national rugby league team players
Australian rugby league players
Rugby league five-eighths
Rugby league locks
Rugby league players from Newcastle, New South Wales
Western Suburbs Rosellas players